Flat Creek Township is one of twenty-five townships in Barry County, Missouri, United States. As of the 2000 census, its population was 5,462.

Flat Creek was organized in 1844, taking its name from Flat Creek.

Geography
It contains six cemeteries: Corinth, Horner, Oak Hill, Pilant, Quaker and Russell.

Transportation
Flat Creek Township contains one airport or landing strip, Cassville Municipal Airport.

Notable people

Don Johnson – actor, producer, director, singer and songwriter.
Curtis F. Marbut – director of the Soil Survey Division of the U.S. Department of Agriculture

References

 USGS Geographic Names Information System (GNIS)

External links
 US-Counties.com
 City-Data.com

Townships in Barry County, Missouri
Townships in Missouri
1844 establishments in Missouri